The Myanmar Petroleum Trade Association, also called MPTA, is a national level organization that oversee and monopolise private petroleum distribution market in Myanmar. The MPTA is run by the local companies that dominate the market. In 2017, the MPTA criticize the government's decision to open the fuel market to foreign investors.

Myanmar Petroleum Trade Association was founded in 2010. As of 2017, there are 400 members in MPTA.

References

External links
 Myanmar Petroleum Trade Association (MPTA)

Trade associations based in Myanmar
2010 establishments in Myanmar
Organizations established in 2010
Petroleum in Myanmar